Trevor Keegan (born August 30, 2000) is an American football offensive guard for the Michigan Wolverines.

Early years and high school career
Keegan was born in 2000 and attended Crystal Lake Central High School in Crystal Lake, Illinois. He was rated among the top recruits on the offensive line and received scholarship offers from multiple schools, including Georgia, Penn State, and Michigan. He committed to Michigan in December 2018.

College career
Keegan enrolled at Michigan in 2019 but did not appear in any games. As a sophomore in 2020, he played five games on special teams and two on offensive line.

As a junior in 2021, Keegan started 11 games (including the Orange Bowl) at left guard and was part of Michigan's offensive line that won the Joe Moore Award. 

Prior to the 2022 season, Keegan lost approximately 30 pounds, going from 340-343 pounds to 303-305 pounds. As a senior, he started at left guard in nine regular season games. At the end of the 2022 regular season, Keegan was selected by the conference coaches and media as a first-team offensive guard on the 2022 All-Big Ten Conference football team. All three of Michigan's interior offensive lineman (Keegan, Olusegun Oluwatimi, and Zak Zinter) were named to the first team by the conference coaches.

References

External links
 Michigan Wolverines bio

2000 births
Living people
American football offensive guards
Michigan Wolverines football players
People from Crystal Lake, Illinois
Players of American football from Illinois